Georgie Winsley Cupidon (born November 10, 1981) is a badminton player from Seychelles. He competed in badminton at the 2008 Summer Olympics in the mixed doubles with Juliette Ah-Wan and they were defeated in the first round by Robert Mateusiak and Nadieżda Kostiuczyk. He carried the national flag at the 2008 Summer Olympics opening ceremony. Together with Ah-Wan, he won the gold medals at the 2006 and 2007 African Championships, also at the 2007 All-Africa Games. He competed in four consecutive Commonwealth Games from 2002 to 2014.

Achievements

All-Africa Games 
Men's doubles

Mixed doubles

African Championships 
Men's doubles

Mixed doubles

BWF International Challenge/Series
Men's doubles

Mixed doubles

 BWF International Challenge tournament
 BWF International Series tournament
 BWF Future Series tournament

References

External links
 
 
 
 
 
 
 
 

1981 births
Living people
Seychellois male badminton players
People from Greater Victoria, Seychelles
Badminton players at the 2008 Summer Olympics
Olympic badminton players of Seychelles
Badminton players at the 2002 Commonwealth Games
Badminton players at the 2006 Commonwealth Games
Badminton players at the 2010 Commonwealth Games
Badminton players at the 2014 Commonwealth Games
Commonwealth Games competitors for Seychelles
Competitors at the 2003 All-Africa Games
Competitors at the 2007 All-Africa Games
Competitors at the 2011 All-Africa Games
Competitors at the 2015 African Games
African Games gold medalists for Seychelles
African Games silver medalists for Seychelles
African Games bronze medalists for Seychelles
African Games medalists in badminton